Local elections were held in Ilocos Sur on May 9, 2022, as part of the 2022 Philippine general election. Voters will select candidates for all local positions: a town mayor, vice mayor, and town councilors, as well as members of the Sangguniang Panlalawigan, a vice-governor, a governor, and representatives for the province's two congressional districts in the Philippine House of Representatives.

Provincial elections

Governor

Vice Governor

Congressional elections

Congressional districts

1st District

2nd District

Provincial Board elections

Provincial Board

1st District 

|colspan=5 bgcolor=black|

2nd District 

|colspan=5 bgcolor=black|

References 

2022 Philippine local elections
May 2022 events in the Philippines